Grant Stafford and Kevin Ullyett were the defending champions, but did not participate this year.

Max Mirnyi and Nenad Zimonjić won in the final 7–6, 3–6, 6–3, against Doug Flach and Brian MacPhie.

Seeds

  Patrick Galbraith /  Justin Gimelstob (quarterfinals)
  Nicklas Kulti /  Mikael Tillström (quarterfinals)
  Sébastien Lareau /  David Roditi (first round)
  Brandon Coupe /  Mark Merklein (quarterfinals)

Draw

Draw

External links
Draw

Delray Beach Open
1999 ATP Tour
1999 in American tennis
1999 Citrix Tennis Championships